"Everybody Loves to Cha Cha Cha" (originally released as "Everybody Likes to Cha Cha Cha") is a song by American singer-songwriter Sam Cooke, released in January 1959. The song was one of Cooke's biggest successes on Billboard Hot R&B Sides chart, peaking at number two; the song also charted at number 31 on the Billboard Hot 100.

The song references the cha-cha-cha, a dance of Cuban origin that became popular in the United States in the late 1950s.

Background
The song originated from a Christmas 1958 party at Lou Rawls' stepfather's house. During the celebration, all began doing the cha-cha-cha, including Cooke's daughter, Linda. When one of the kids called out, "Everybody, cha-cha-cha!", Cooke grabbed a sheet of paper and wrote down the lyrics while everyone else danced. The song was recorded the week after New Year's 1959.

The song concerns Cooke and his girlfriend going to a dance in which all are doing the cha-cha-cha, a dance which his significant other doesn't know how to do. Cooke teaches his guest but by the end of the evening, she is "doing [the cha-cha-cha]" better than he is.

Personnel
Credits adapted from the liner notes to the 2003 compilation Portrait of a Legend: 1951–1964.
Sam Cooke – vocals
Adolphus Asbrook – bass guitar
Charles Blackwell – drums
Jack Costanza – bongos
Rene Hall – guitar
Mike Pacheco – congas
Clifton White – guitar
 The back-up vocals are provided by Darlene Love and The Blossoms

Charts and certifications

Weekly charts

References

1959 singles
Sam Cooke songs
Songs written by Sam Cooke
1959 songs
Keen Records singles